Guinan may refer to:

 Guinan County, Qinghai, China
 Guinan dialect, of Yue Chinese
 Guinan (Star Trek), fictional character of Star Trek science fiction franchise

People with the given name
 Guinan Khairy (1903–1938), Bashkir poet, writer and playwright

People with the surname
 J. Edward Guinan, American community activist, founder of the Community for Creative Non-Violence
 Edward Guinan, American professor of astronomy and astrophysics
 Francis Guinan, American actor
 Francisco González Guinán (1841–1932), Venezuelan politician, journalist, lawyer, and historian
 Larry Guinan (born 1938), Irish hurler
 Mary Guinan, American virologist
 Matthew Guinan (1910–1995), American labor organizer
 Robert Guinan (1934–2016), Chicago-based American painter
 Steve Guinan (born 1975), English footballer 
 Texas Guinan (1884–1933), American actress, producer and entrepreneur